Rochester Independent School District was a public school district based in Rochester, Texas (USA). It existed from the early 1900s to 2005. From 2002 to 2005, the district was known as the Rochester County Line Independent School District.

The district consisted of a single campus - Rochester School - that served students in grades pre-kindergarten through twelve. It was located in northwestern Haskell County and included a small portion of extreme northeastern Stonewall County.

District enrollment (1988-2005)

1988-89 - 178 students
1989-90 - 180 students
1990-91 - 177 students
1991-92 - 183 students
1992-93 - 176 students
1993-94 - 204 students
1994-95 - 177 students
1995-96 - 169 students
1996-97 - 173 students
1997-98 - 160 students
1998-99 - 172 students
1999-00 - 143 students
2000-01 - 132 students
2001-02 - 125 students
2002-03 - 111 students
2003-04 - 109 students
2004-05 - 40 students

The ethnic composition of students in the 2004-2005 school year was 20 White (50%), 18 Hispanic (45%), and 2 African American (5%). Of the 40 students, 33 (82.5%) were considered economically disadvantaged.

Student performance
Rochester ISD's performance on the Texas Assessment of Academic Skills (TAAS), a state standardized test used from 1991 to 2003, was generally above state standards. The district received the highest rating of "exemplary" on four occasions (1997–98, 1998–99, 1999-00, and 2000–01) and the second highest rating of "recognized" four times (1995–96, 1996–97, 2001–02, and 2002–03).

A new standardized test, the Texas Assessment of Knowledge and Skills (TAKS) was introduced in 2003. Rochester received a rating of "academically acceptable" for the 2003–04 and 2004-05 school years.

Consolidation
The district, faced with a rapidly declining enrollment, held a vote in February 2004 on whether or not to merge with the larger Haskell Consolidated Independent School District. In order for the proposal to pass, voters in both Rochester and Haskell had to approve the plan. Rochester voters rejected the plan with 128 voting in favor (46.5%) and 147 opposed (53.5%).

A second vote on the issue took place on November 2, 2004, this time receiving the approval of both communities. In Rochester, 152 voted for consolidation (60.8%) while 98 voted against it (39.2%). Haskell voters approved the plan by a margin of 574-111 (83.8%-16.2%).

The consolidation took effect on June 1, 2005. When classes resumed in August, the Rochester campus became Rochester Junior High, serving the district's seventh and eighth graders.

External links

Haskell Consolidated ISD
Rochester Junior High School
 Texas Education Agency maps:
 PDF: Parts in Haskell County (majority) and Stonewall County (minority)
 Web: Parts in Haskell County (majority) and Stonewall County (minority)

Former school districts in Texas
School districts in Haskell County, Texas
School districts in Stonewall County, Texas
School districts disestablished in 2005
1990s establishments in Texas
2005 disestablishments in Texas